Turn Your Radio On is Ray Stevens' eighth studio album and his third for Barnaby Records, released in 1972. The title comes from a gospel song written by Albert E. Brumley. Unlike Stevens' previous album releases, this album shows Stevens' spiritual side and was his first album of gospel music. The fourth track, "Let Your Love Be a Light unto the People", was written by Stevens' brother, John Ragsdale. The sixth track, "Have a Little Talk with Myself", was taken from Stevens' album of the same name. The album includes four singles, three of which were issued before the album's release: "A Mama and a Papa", the traditional gospel song "All My Trials", the title track, and "Love Lifted Me".

The album was reissued by CBS Records in 1982. On November 15, 2005, Collectables Records re-released the album and his 1975 album, Misty, together on one CD.

Track listing

Album credits
Choral backing for "Love Lifted Me": B.C. & M. Mass Choir
All other vocal backing: Ray Stevens
Arranged and produced by: Ray Stevens for Ahab Productions, Inc.
Engineer: Charlie Tallent
Design: Rod Dyer
Cover photo: John Donegan

Charts
Album - Billboard (North America)

Singles - Billboard (North America)

References

1972 albums
Ray Stevens albums
Barnaby Records albums
Gospel albums by American artists